COP9 signalosome complex subunit 2 is a protein that in humans is encoded by the COPS2 gene. It encodes a subunit of the COP9 signalosome.

Interactions 

COPS2 has been shown to interact with:
 DAX1,
 IRF8, 
 NIF3L1,  and
 THRA.

References

External links

Further reading